Jolanta Ogar-Hill (born 28 April 1982, in Brzesko) is a Polish competitive sailor. At the 2020 Summer Olympics, she competed in the women's 470 with team-mate Agnieszka Skrzypulec and won a silver medal. Since October 2014 she competed under the flag of Austria together with her Austrian teammate Lara Vadlau. Together they were successful at the 470 World Championships in La Rochelle in 2013 (silver medal) and in 2014 in Santander (gold medal).

In October 2014 Jolanta Ogar and Lara Vadlau were rewarded with the Austrian "Team of the Year 2014" award.

Since 2016 she has been competing again under the flag of Poland.

Personal life
She came out as lesbian at the age of 21. She has taken part in the #SportAgainstHomophobia campaign launched by the Campaign Against Homophobia.

References

External links

1982 births
Living people
Polish female sailors (sport)
Austrian female sailors (sport)
470 class world champions
World champions in sailing for Austria
Olympic sailors of Austria
Olympic sailors of Poland
Olympic silver medalists for Poland
Olympic medalists in sailing
Sailors at the 2012 Summer Olympics – 470
Sailors at the 2016 Summer Olympics – 470
Sailors at the 2020 Summer Olympics – 470
Medalists at the 2020 Summer Olympics
Polish LGBT sportspeople
21st-century LGBT people
People from Brzesko
Sportspeople from Lesser Poland Voivodeship